A landline (land line, land-line, main line, home phone, fixed-line, and wireline) is a telephone connection that uses metal wires or optical fiber telephone line for transmission, as distinguished from a mobile cellular network, which uses radio waves for signal transmission.

Characteristics 

Landline service is typically provided through the outside plant of a telephone company's central office, or wire center. The outside plant comprises tiers of cabling between distribution points in the exchange area, so that a single pair of copper wire, or an optical fiber, reaches each subscriber location, such as a home or office, at the network interface. Customer premises wiring extends from the network interface to the location of one or more telephones inside the premises.

The telephone connected to a landline can be hard-wired or cordless and typically refers to the operation of wireless devices or systems in fixed locations such as homes. Fixed wireless devices usually derive their electrical power from the utility mains electricity, unlike mobile wireless or portable wireless, which tend to be battery-powered. Although mobile and portable systems can be used in fixed locations, efficiency and bandwidth are compromised compared with fixed systems. Mobile or portable, battery-powered wireless systems can be used as emergency backups for fixed systems in case of a power blackout or natural disaster.

Usage 

In 2003, the CIA World Factbook reported approximately 1.263 billion main telephone lines worldwide.  China  had more than any other country, at 350 million, and the United States was second with 268 million. The United Kingdom had 23.7 million residential fixed home phones.

The 2013 statistics show that the total number of fixed-telephone subscribers in the world was about 1.26 billion. The number of landline subscribers continuously decreases due to upgrades in digital technology and the conveniences that come with switching to wireless (cellular) or Internet-based alternatives.

Successors 
In many countries, landline service has not been readily available to most people. In some countries in Africa, the rise in cell phones has outpaced growth in landline service. Between 1998 and 2008, Africa added only 2.4 million landlines.  In contrast, between 2000 and 2008, cell phone use rose from fewer than 2 in 100 people to 33 out of 100. There has also been a substantial decline of landline phones in the Indian subcontinent, in urban and even more in rural areas.

In the early 21st century, the landline telephone has declined due to the advancement of mobile network technology and the obsolescence of the old copper wire networking.  It is more difficult to install landline copper wires to every user than it is to install mobile wireless towers that many people can connect to. Eventually these metallic networks will be deemed completely out of date and replaced by more efficient broadband and fiber optic landline connections extending to rural areas and places where telecommunication was much more sparse. Some see this happening as soon as the year 2025.

In 2004, only about 45% of people in the United States between the ages of 12 and 17 owned cell phones.  At that time, most had to rely on landline telephones.  Just 4 years later, that percentage climbed to about 71%.  That same year, 2008, about 77% of adults owned a mobile phone.  In the year 2013, 91% of adults in the United States owned a mobile phone.  Almost 60% of those with a mobile had a smartphone. A National Health Interview Survey of 19,956 households by the Centers for Disease Control and Prevention released May 4, 2017 showed 45.9 percent of U.S. households still had landlines, while 50.8 percent had only cell phones. Over 39 percent had both.

In Canada, more than one in five of households use cell phones as their only source for telephone service. In 2013, statistics showed that 21% of households claimed to only use cellular phones. Households that are owned by members under the age of 35 have a considerably higher percentage of exclusive cell phone use. In 2013,  60% of young household owners claimed to only use cell phones.

By means of porting, voice over IP services can host landline numbers previously hosted on traditional fixed telephone networks. VoIP services can be used anywhere an internet connection is available on many devices including Smartphones, giving great flexibility to where calls may be answered and thus facilitating remote, mobile and home working, for example. VoIP porting allows landline numbers to remain in use, whilst freeing them from actual landlines tied to one location. This is useful where landline numbers are believed to be preferred by callers, or where it is preferable that legacy landline numbers remain connected.

See also 

 Plain old telephone service
 Local loop
 Last mile
 Field telephone

References 

Telephony
Local loop

de:Festnetzanschluss